A British Overseas Territories citizen (BOTC), formerly called British Dependent Territories citizen (BDTC), is a member of a class of British nationality granted to people connected with one or more of the British Overseas Territories (previously designated British colonies).

This category was created to differentiate between British nationals with strong ties to the United Kingdom and those connected only with an overseas territory (other than Gibraltar or the Falkland Islands), both of which groups had shared Citizenship of the United Kingdom and Colonies (CUKC) before 1 January 1983. The primary right of citizenship, that of abode in the United Kingdom, had been involuntarily taken away from colonial CUKCs by 1968 and 1971 Acts of Parliament, unless they retained it through a qualifying connection with the United Kingdom. Under the British Nationality Act 1981, which went into effect on 1 January 1983, colonial CUKCs (other than Gibraltarians and Falkland Islanders) without a qualifying connection to the United Kingdom became British Dependent Territories citizens (renamed British Overseas Territories citizenship in 2002), a citizenship which did not include right of abode anywhere; not even in the territories in which they were born (CUKCs born in the United Kingdom, Gibraltar, the Falkland Islands, or the Crown Dependencies of the Channel Islands and the Isle of Man all became British Citizens, with right of abode in the United Kingdom). Those with British Overseas Territories citizenship remained British nationals (subject to British sovereignty), but not British citizens (although British Dependent Territories Citizenship or British Overseas Territories Citizenship is a class of British citizenship, stripped of the most basic citizenship rights, not a citizenship of a British Overseas Territory or of the British Overseas Territories collectively as the name was intended to imply). As the United Kingdom is a Commonwealth Realm, all British Nationals, including BDTCs, remained Commonwealth citizens, though free movement by citizens of other Commonwealth countries into the United Kingdom had ended with the Commonwealth Immigrants Act 1962 (the British Overseas Territories are not members of the Commonwealth in their own rights, as it is a community of independent nations, one of which is the United Kingdom).

BOTC status does not give the holder right of abode in the United Kingdom, but since 2002, almost all BOTCs simultaneously hold British citizenship, except for those connected only with the territory of Akrotiri and Dhekelia. Nationals of this class who are not also full citizens are subject to immigration controls when entering the UK. About 63,000 BOTCs hold active British passports with this status and enjoy consular protection when travelling abroad.

The territories
The British Overseas Territories are Anguilla, Bermuda, the British Antarctic Territory, the British Indian Ocean territory, the British Virgin Islands, the Cayman Islands, the Falkland Islands, Gibraltar, Montserrat, the Pitcairn Islands, Saint Helena, Ascension and Tristan da Cunha, South Georgia and the South Sandwich Islands, the sovereign base areas of Akrotiri and Dhekelia, and the Turks and Caicos Islands.

Background

Before the British Nationality Act 1981, colonies of the British Empire were known as Crown colonies (although those with internal representative government were distinguished as self-governing colonies) of which there were a large number. Many of these became independent or parts of other countries before the new status was introduced. All natural-born British subjects previously held the unrestricted right of free movement in any part of the British Empire. (Originally the status of subject implied fealty or duties to the Crown without any inherent rights, but at the time of the Act's passing this term had already long been archaic as the Crown's subjects had steadily accrued citizenship rights with the formation of the Parliament of England, with its House of Commons and House of Lords.) By 1981, the status of British Subject had already become interchangeable in meaning with British citizen and British national.

As different areas of the empire were delegated legislative power from London, these territories gradually enacted their own laws governing entry and residence rights. However, these local laws did not affect British subjects' rights under UK domestic law, most particularly the right-of-abode in the United Kingdom of Great Britain and Northern Ireland, which were not subject to the locality the citizen was born or resided in, or the degree of local autonomy within that region. Several of the largest self-governing colonies achieved Dominion status (starting with Canadian Confederation in 1867), placing their governments on an equal footing to, but retaining links with, that of the United Kingdom. (The dominions collectively were the Commonwealth referred to in the phrase the British Empire and Commonwealth.)

Following the Second World War, all of the dominions and many colonies quickly chose complete political independence. Together with the United Kingdom (including its remaining colonies) all these territories formed a new Commonwealth of Nations (usually abbreviated to just "Commonwealth"). While each Commonwealth nation distinguished its own citizens, with the British Government's British Nationality Act 1948 categorising subjects from the United Kingdom and its remaining overseas territories as Citizens of the United Kingdom and Colonies (CUKCs), British subject was retained as an umbrella nationality encompassing all Commonwealth citizens, including CUKCs, so that those "belonging" to one territory would not be considered aliens in another. Although colonies that had not become independent Dominions remained under British sovereignty, they also had an accepted right to determine local immigration policy.

The Irish Free State, a dominion of the British Empire formed on 6 December 1922 under the Anglo-Irish Treaty of December 1921 (that had ended the three-year Irish War of Independence), which had been renamed Éire in 1937, effectively retained a common border with the United Kingdom by linking its immigration law with that of the United Kingdom. Éire became independent under the Irish Republic of Ireland Act 1948 and the British Ireland Act 1949. As a republic, it did not become part of the new Commonwealth and Irish citizens did not remain British subjects. The British Act specified that even though the Republic of Ireland was no longer a British dominion, it would not be treated as a foreign country for the purposes of British law and  made certain technical provisions in relation to both transitional matters and to the citizenship of certain individuals born before the Irish Free State ceased to form part of the United Kingdom of Great Britain and Ireland. It also fixed a mistake in the British Nationality Act 1948 and conferred CUKC status on any Irish-born person meeting all the following criteria:

 born before 6 December 1922 in what became the Republic of Ireland;
 domiciled outside the Republic of Ireland on 6 December 1922;
 ordinarily resident outside the Republic of Ireland from 1935 to 1948; and
 not registered as an Irish citizen under Irish legislation.

Although, as Éire was a British Dominion, the Irish had remained British subjects with the rights to free movement into and abode in the United Kingdom, Éire had refused to join the British war effort in 1939, remaining neutral through the Second World War, and controls were introduced on movements between Éire and the United Kingdom in September 1939. From June 1940, the British Government also required a permit for any travel to or from Ireland. The Government of Éire restricted travel to the United Kingdom to those travelling for employment, and barred entry from the United Kingdom except by British subjects (including Irish persons). The British Government's permit requirement was allowed to lapse in 1947, and the Government of Éire permitted foreign nationals to enter via the United Kingdom from December 1946. However, the immigration controls Britain introduced in September 1939, for arrivals from Éire, remained in place until an unpublicised agreement between the governments of the United Kingdom and the Republic of Ireland established the Common Travel Area, which ensured non-CUKC Irish Citizens would be able to freely enter, reside, and work in the United Kingdom even though the Republic of Ireland was not part of the new Commonwealth of Nations.

All CUKCs initially retained the right to enter and live in the UK. Immigration from the former colonies of the Commonwealth was restricted by Parliament in 1962. The Commonwealth Immigrants Act 1962, which resulted from racist anger at the increasing number of people of colour migrating from the colonies remaining British and from the Commonwealth countries, raised barriers to the immigration of Commonwealth citizens. It did, at least, ensure that certain colonials would remain Citizens of the United Kingdom and Colonies if their colonies chose independence. This was primarily for the benefit of ethnic-Indians in African colonies, such as Kenya, to ensure they would not be left stateless in case they were denied the citizenship of the newly independent countries.

Citizens of the new Commonwealth countries who had a qualifying link to the United Kingdom (who had been born in the United Kingdom, or who had a father or grandfather born in the United Kingdom) retained CUKC, becoming dual-nationals.

The British Nationality Act 1964 (an amendment to the 1948 Act) was passed to enable those who had renounced CUKC in order to obtain citizenship of another Commonwealth country to regain it, providing they had a father or grandfather born in the United Kingdom.

Many ethnic-Indians from former African colonies such as Kenya (which became independent in December 1963) and Uganda (which became independent in October 1962) retained CUKC under the Commonwealth Immigrants Act 1962 and began to move to the United Kingdom following independence, resulting in the rapid passing of the Commonwealth Immigrants Act 1968 to stop this migration. The Act removed the rights of free entry to, and abode and work in, the United Kingdom from those British Subjects who were not born in, or possessed of a qualifying connection to, the United Kingdom. This applied not only CUKCs from Commonwealth countries, but also to those Citizens of the United Kingdom and Colonies in the remaining colonies.

The Immigration Act 1971 introduced the concept of patriality, by which only British subjects (i.e. CUKCs and Commonwealth citizens) with sufficiently strong links to the British Islands (e.g. being born in the islands or having a parent or a grandparent who was born there) had right of abode, meaning they were exempt from immigration control and had the right to enter, live and work in the islands. The act, therefore, had de facto created two types of CUKCs: those with right of abode in the UK, and those without right of abode in the UK (who might or might not have right of abode in a Crown colony or another country). Despite differences in immigration status being created, there was no de jure difference between the two in a nationality context, as the 1948 Act still specified one tier of citizenship throughout the UK and its colonies. This changed in 1983, when the 1948 Act was replaced by a multi-tier nationality system.

The current principal British nationality law in force, since 1 January 1983, is the British Nationality Act 1981, which established the system of multiple categories of British nationality. To date, six tiers were created: British citizens, British Overseas Territories citizens, British Overseas citizens, British Nationals (Overseas), British subjects, and British protected persons. Only British citizens and certain Commonwealth citizens have the automatic right of abode in the UK, with the latter holding residual rights they had prior to 1983.

The stripping of birthrights from at least some of the colonial CUKCs in 1968 and 1971, and the change of their citizenships in 1983, removed the rights granted them irrevocably by royal charters at the founding of the colonies. Bermuda (fully The Somers Isles or Islands of Bermuda), by example, had been officially settled by the London Company (which had been in occupation of the archipelago since the 1609 wreck of the Sea Venture) in 1612 (with a Lieutenant-Governor and sixty settlers joining the three Sea Venture survivors left there in 1610), when it received its Third Royal Charter from King James I, amending the boundaries of the First Colony of Virginia far enough across the Atlantic to include Bermuda. The citizenship rights guaranteed to settlers by King James I in the original royal charter of the 10 April 1606, thereby applied to Bermudians:

These rights were confirmed in the royal charter granted to the London Company's spin-off, the Company of the City of London for the Plantacion of The Somers Isles, in 1615 on Bermuda being separated from Virginia:

In regards to former CUKCs of St. Helena, Lord Beaumont of Whitley stated in the House of Lords debate on the British Overseas Territories Bill on 10 July 2001:

Aside from different categories of a citizenship, the 1981 Act also ceased to recognise Commonwealth citizens as British subjects. There remain only two categories of people who are still designated British Subjects (though all British nationals are by definition British subjects, regardless of the class of British citizenship, being subject to the sovereignty of the British Government): those (formerly known as British subjects without citizenship) who acquired British nationality through a connection with former British India, and those connected with the Republic of Ireland before 1949 who have made a declaration to retain British nationality. British subjects connected with former British India lose British nationality if they acquire another citizenship.

Conversely, CUKCs did not have automatic right of abode in the colonies. After passage of the British Nationality Act 1981, CUKCs were reclassified into different nationality groups based on their ancestry and birthplace: CUKCs with right of abode in the United Kingdom or who were closely connected with the UK, the Channel Islands, the Isle of Man, Gibraltar, or the Falkland Islands became British Citizens while those connected with any other remaining colony became British Dependent Territories Citizens (BDTCs). Right of abode in the territories is dependent on possession of belonger status, regardless of which type of British citizenship is possessed.

The results of the Acts of 1968, 1971, and 1981 were the cause of much anger in the negatively-affected British Dependent Territories, as the colonies were renamed. Detrimentally stripping away birthrights from colonials was cause enough for this anger, but observing that Gibraltar and the Falkland Islands retained full British Citizenship emphasised the racist ideology that underlay these changes. In wealthy and self-reliant Bermuda, which had absorbed considerable immigration from the United Kingdom since the 1940s despite having its own immigration controls (of the 71,176 persons estimated to reside in Bermuda in 2018, 30% were not born in Bermuda, of which those born in the United Kingdom are the largest demographic group). As this immigration has been sustained for decades (the 1950 census showed 2,718 residents who had been born in the United Kingdom, out of a population of about 30,000), a substantial portion of the 70% who were born in Bermuda have parents or grandparents born in the United Kingdom.

The majority of Bermudians who retained right of abode in the United Kingdom after 1 January 1983 were, however, white (with whites making up a third of the population). Very few of Bermuda's majority blacks (whose actual ancestry is any mixture of European, African, and Native American) retained right of abode in the United Kingdom through a forebear born in the United Kingdom. Although after the 1 January 1983 any BDTC who legally resided in the United Kingdom for five years (generally with a student's visa or a work permit) was entitled to have leave to remain entered into his or her passport, this was an avenue that few blacks could utilise, as not many could afford to study in the United Kingdom (especially given the extortionate university fees to which they were subject, whereas many white colonials with the right of abode in the United Kingdom paid only a fraction of the tuition), and fewer still were able to obtain a work permit. This situation was especially infuriating to black Bermudians given the number of whites from the United Kingdom working in well-paid jobs in Bermuda's financial sector (of Bermuda's total workforce of 38,947 persons in 2005, 11,223 (29%) were non-Bermudians), in which marginalised blacks are under-represented, who also have had the effect of driving up housing costs to the particular detriment of low-paid blacks (the Government of Bermuda's 2009 employment survey showed the median annual income for blacks for the year 2007–08 was $50,539, and for whites was $71,607, with white Bermudian clerks earning $8,000 a year more than black Bermudian clerks, and black Bermudian senior officials and managers earning $73,242 compared to $91,846 for white Bermudian senior officials and managers; the racial disparity was also observed among expatriate workers, with white non-Bermudian senior officials and managers earning $47,000 more than black non-Bermudian senior officials and managers). For decades, working class Bermudians, mostly but not all black, have been forced to work multiple jobs to eke out a living, with the cost of a house having spiralled out of reach for even most university educated thanks largely to the flooding of Bermuda with affluent international business workers and their families, disproportionately from the United Kingdom. High real estate values on the 21 square mile archipelago drive up the costs of all other necessaries. This has been drastically worsened by the 2008 global recession (and through the debt taken on by the Progressive Labour Party during its first period in Government), which has worst affected the most marginalised. Between 2010 and 2016, annual income of black Bermudian workers fell 13% and that of whites rose 1%. As the job market shrank, blacks were hardest hit also. In 2013, black unemployment was officially calculated as 9% and white and Permanent Resident unemployment was 2%. The hardships most blacks are placed in, and the wealth disparity compared to whites, and especially to immigrant whites, has bred a deep resentment of expatriate workers, large numbers of whom have obtained Bermudian status as poorer blacks are increasingly forced by the cost-of-living to emigrate (a 2019 survey by The Royal Gazette newspaper of Bermuda found over 76% or respondents cited the cost-of-living as their reason for leaving Bermuda). Black Bermudians with little or no savings and no university education do not even have the same prospects when emigrating as many whites.

 Debate over full citizenship rights 
At the time of nationality reclassification in 1983, the largest group of BDTCs (2.5 million people) was associated with Hong Kong.Lord Wyatt of Weeford, col. 863. The British government was unwilling to grant full citizenship and immigration rights to Hongkongers, fearing a mass migration to the UK after the transfer of sovereignty to China in 1997.

 Restoration of citizenship 

Almost five years after Hong Kong was transferred to China, Parliament restored access to full British citizenship and right of abode in the United Kingdom to virtually all British Dependent Territories citizens. The sole exception to this was for those living in Akrotiri and Dhekelia, which were excluded due to their status as military bases as specified in the treaty establishing Cyprus. Any person who was a BDTC before 21 May 2002 automatically became a British citizen on that date, and children born after that date to BDTCs also automatically acquire full citizenship. Additionally, the Act renamed the status British Overseas Territories citizenship, mirroring the name change for the territories themselves as well., s. 2.

 Acquisition and loss 

There are four ways to acquire British Overseas Territories citizenship: by birth, adoption, descent, or naturalisation.

Individuals born in a territory automatically receive BOTC status if at least one parent is a BOTC or has belonger status. Children born to British citizen parents who are not settled in an overseas territory are not BOTCs at birth. Parents do not necessarily need to be connected with the same overseas territory to pass on BOTC status. Alternatively, a child born in an overseas territory may be registered as a BOTC if either parent becomes a BOTC or settles in any overseas territory subsequent to birth. A child who lives in the same territory until age 10 and is not absent for more than 90 days in each year is also entitled to registration as a BOTC. Furthermore, an adopted child automatically become a BOTC on the effective day of adoption if either parent is a BOTC or has belonger status. In all cases that an individual is a British Overseas Territories citizen at birth or adoption within the territories, that person is a BOTC otherwise than by descent.

Individuals born outside of the territories are BOTCs by descent if either parent is a BOTC otherwise than by descent. Unmarried BOTC fathers cannot automatically pass down their BOTC status, and it would be necessary for them to register children as BOTCs.

A child, now an adult, born abroad before 1 July 2006, (not in the UK or one of its Territories), to an unmarried BOTC born-father, is denied the right to claim his/her BOTC fathers' citizenship-by-descent. However, after a strong campaign by a group called 'British Overseas Territories Citizenship Campaign' led by US-based actor and advocate  Trent Lamont Miller, a son of a British Montserrat-born father, the Home Secretary Priti Patel announced in a policy statement on 24 March 2021 that the UK Government's intends to remove this discrimination through additional legislation which will provide a retrospective right to register for nationality purposes. In that same announcement, Patel stated the Government also intends to remove discrimination against children born abroad before 1 January 1981 to BOTC mothers. Amendments will be made to the British Nationality Act 1981. In 2014, the same rights were made retrospective for children born to UK mainland British fathers. BOTC children of descent were intentionally left out. The new legislation will rectify this anomaly. Here are the key areas to be rectified:

1.	Children born before 1 January 1983 to BOTC mothers
Before 1 January 1983 women could not pass on British nationality to a child born outside the UK and Colonies. Provisions to allow for children born before 1983 to British citizen mothers to be registered as British citizens were introduced in the Nationality, Immigration, and Asylum Act 2002, but were not extended to BOTC mothers. This was because the registration provision was introduced to extend a concession announced in 1979 for the registration of children of UK-born mothers.  The aim in 2002 was to cover those who could have been registered as children on the basis of that concession but had not applied in time. The criteria introduced - that the person would (if women could have passed on citizenship at that time) have become a citizen of the UK and Colonies and acquired a right of abode in the UK - aimed to cover those who had a maternal connection with the UK. The registration criteria were extended in legislation in 2009, but as this was introduced as an unexpected Lord’s amendment there was no time to consult with BOT governments about the implications of doing something for BOTCs, which could have an impact on territory migration.

2.	Children born before 1 July 2006 to BOTC fathers
Similarly, children born to British unmarried fathers could not acquire British nationality through their father before 1 July 2006. Registration provisions were introduced for people born to unmarried British citizen fathers before 1 July 2006 to be registered as citizens by section 65 of the Immigration Act 2014. These provide for a person to register as a British citizen if they would have acquired that status automatically under the British Nationality Act 1981, had their father been married to their mother.

Section 65 was introduced at a very late stage in the Bill debates: it was recognised that each overseas territory has its own immigration law, and to create a route for people to become British overseas territories citizens (which could give a right of abode in a territory) would require wider consultation with governors and territory governments, which was not possible prior to the introduction of that Act.  Corresponding provisions were not therefore included for British overseas territories citizenship.

3.	British Overseas Territories Act 2002
The British Overseas Territories Act 2002 provided that anyone who was a BOTC on 21 May 2002 automatically became a British citizen. Equally, it allowed for British citizenship to be acquired through birth in an overseas territory or to a relevant parent from an overseas territory. This means that people in the above groups have missed out on both BOTC and British citizenship. The British Nationality Act 1981, therefore, needs to be amended to allow them to acquire the statuses they would have had if the law had not been discriminatory.

If a parent is a BOTC by descent, additional requirements apply to register children as BOTCs. Parents serving in Crown service who have children abroad are exempted from these circumstances, and their children would be BOTCs otherwise than by descent as if they had been born on their home territory.

Foreigners and non-BOTC British nationals may naturalise as British Overseas Territories citizens after residing in a territory for more than five years and possessing belonger status or permanent residency for more than one year. The residency requirement is reduced to three years if an applicant is married to a BOTC. All applicants for naturalisation and registration are normally considered by the governor of the relevant territory, but the Home Secretary retains discretionary authority to grant BOTC status. Since 2004, BOTC applicants aged 18 or older are required to take an oath of allegiance to the Sovereign and loyalty pledge to the relevant territory during their citizenship ceremonies.

British Overseas Territories citizenship can be relinquished by a declaration made to the governor of the connected territory, provided that a person already possesses or intends to acquire another nationality. BOTC status can be deprived if it was fraudulently acquired or if an individual is solely connected with a territory that becomes independent and that person gains the new country's citizenship. The last territory to have done so is Saint Kitts and Nevis in 1983. BDTCs connected with Hong Kong also had their status removed at the transfer of sovereignty in 1997, but were able to register for British National (Overseas) status before the handover.

 Rights and privileges 
British Overseas Territories citizens are exempted from obtaining a visa or entry certificate when visiting the United Kingdom for less than six months. They are eligible to apply for two-year working holiday visas and do not face annual quotas or sponsorship requirements. When travelling in other countries, they may seek British consular protection. BOTCs are not considered foreign nationals when residing in the UK and are entitled to certain rights as Commonwealth citizens. These include exemption from registration with local police, voting eligibility in UK elections, and the ability to enlist in the British Armed Forces. British Overseas Territories citizens are also eligible to serve in non-reserved Civil Service posts, be granted British honours, receive peerages, and sit in the House of Lords. If given indefinite leave to remain (ILR), they are eligible to stand for election to the House of Commons and local government.

All British Overseas Territories citizens other than those solely connected with Akrotiri and Dhekelia became British citizens on 21 May 2002, and children born on qualified overseas territories to British citizens since that date are both BOTCs and British citizens otherwise than by descent. Prior to 2002, only BOTCs from Gibraltar and the Falkland Islands were given unrestricted access to citizenship. BOTCs naturalised after that date may also become British citizens by registration at the discretion of the Home Secretary. Becoming a British citizen has no effect on BOTC status; BOTCs may also simultaneously be British citizens.

 Restrictions 

 British Overseas Territories 

Although British Overseas Territories citizenship is granted to individuals who are closely connected to particular territories, each territory maintains separate immigration policies and different requirements for conferring belonger status. BOTC status by itself does not grant its holders right of abode or the right to work in any of the territories and confers no entitlements other than the right to apply for a BOTC passport. Consequently, there are circumstances in which BOTCs do not have right of abode in the territory that they derive their citizenship from. BOTCs who are part of this group and have no other nationality are de facto'' stateless because they are deprived of the right to enter the country that claims them as nationals. Additionally, neither BOTCs nor full British citizens who are not belongers of a given territory may vote or stand for public office in that jurisdiction.

United Kingdom 

British Overseas Territories citizens are subject to immigration controls and have neither the right of abode nor the right to work in the United Kingdom. BOTCs other than Gibraltarians are also required to pay a "health surcharge" to access National Health Service benefits when residing in the UK for longer than six months and do not qualify for most welfare programmes. However, since 2002, almost all BOTCs are also British citizens and have UK right of abode. When exercising that right and entering the UK for a period of more than six months, they must travel with British citizen passports or other valid passports endorsed with a certificate of entitlement for right of abode.

European Union 
Before the United Kingdom withdrew from the European Union on 31 January 2020, full British citizens were European Union citizens. Most British Overseas Territories citizens were not EU citizens and did not enjoy freedom of movement in other EU countries. They were, and continue to be, exempted from obtaining visas when visiting the Schengen Area. Gibraltar was the sole exception to this; BOTCs connected to that territory were also EU citizens and did have freedom of movement within the EU.

References

Citations

Sources

Legislation and case law

Publications

Parliamentary debates 

 
 
 

British nationality law
Nationality law in British Overseas Territories